Lost Together is an album by the American pop rock duo The Rembrandts. It was released on J-Bird Records on October 2, 2001.

Critical reception
AllMusic called the album "a respectable, likable, even modest pop/rock record, better than those of many indies with cooler reputations." The Corvallis Gazette-Times called it "a raucous reunion worthy of the Rembrandts name."

Track listing
"Lost Together"
"St. Paul"
"Too Late"
"You Are the One"
"One Of Us"
"The Way She Smiles"
"Another Day Down"
"Buddy Jo"
"Long Way to Go"
"Big Plans"
"Some Other World"
"Happiness"

References

The Rembrandts albums
2001 albums